Ryan Swain may refer to:

 Ryan Jamaal Swain, American actor and dancer
 Ryan Swain (presenter), English television, radio, live events presenter, and comedian